Sunday on the Rocks is a 2004 independent film directed by Joe Morton and starring Suzzanne Douglas, Cady Huffman, Amiee Turner, Julie White, and Ryan Heide. The story was written by Theresa Rebeck for stage, then adapted by her for film.

Premise
Four women, sharing a house together, spend a Sunday drinking scotch and discussing their past.

Cast
 Suzzanne Douglas as Jessica
 Cady Huffman as Gayle
 Amiee Turner as Jen
 Julie White as Elly
 Ryan Heide as Richardson

References

External links
 
 

2004 films
American independent films
American films based on plays
2000s English-language films
2000s American films